Martin Kližan was the defending champion, but withdrew before the tournament began.
Ernests Gulbis won the title, defeating Guillermo García-López in the final, 3–6, 6–4, 6–0.

Seeds

Draw

Finals

Top half

Bottom half

Qualifying

Seeds

Qualifiers

Qualifying draw

First qualifier

Second qualifier

Third qualifier

Fourth qualifier

References
 Main Draw
 Qualifying Draw

2013 Singles
St. Petersburg Open - Singles
St. Petersburg Open - Singles